Finis Ewing McLean (February 19, 1806 – April 12, 1881) was a United States representative from Kentucky.

Early life
Finis Ewing McLean was born on February 19, 1806, near Russellville, Kentucky. He attended the country schools and Lebanon Academy in Logan County, Kentucky. Later, he studied law, was admitted to the bar. He was the brother of John McLean and uncle of James David Walker.

Career
McLean commenced practice in Elkton, Kentucky in 1827. He also engaged in agricultural pursuits.

Political career
McLean was a member of the Kentucky House of Representatives in 1837 and was also elected as a Whig to the Thirty-first Congress (March 4, 1849 - March 3, 1851). After leaving Congress, he resumed the practice of law and also engaged in agricultural pursuits. He moved to Andrew County, Missouri in 1860 and engaged in farming until 1865. Later, he relocated to Greencastle, Indiana in 1865 in which city he died in 1881. He was buried in Forest Hill Cemetery in Greencastle.

References

External links

1806 births
1881 deaths
Members of the Kentucky House of Representatives
People from Russellville, Kentucky
Whig Party members of the United States House of Representatives from Kentucky
People from Elkton, Kentucky
People from Greencastle, Indiana
19th-century American politicians